Jashpur Airport is located at Aagdih,  east of Jashpur Nagar, in Chhattisgarh, India. The air strip is used mainly for small aircraft. The airstrip lies on the Raipur highway and is owned by the State government.

References 

Defunct airports in India
Airports in Chhattisgarh
Airports with year of establishment missing
Jashpur district